Bristow is an unincorporated community in Vernon County, in the U.S. state of Missouri.

History
A post office called Bristow was established in 1897, and remained in operation until 1901. The community has the name of Joseph L. Bristow, a postal official and afterward U.S. Senator from Kansas.

References

Unincorporated communities in Vernon County, Missouri
Unincorporated communities in Missouri